Elekes may refer to:
Hungarian name of Șona, Romania
Endre Elekes (born 1968), Hungarian Olympic wrestler
György Elekes, Hungarian mathematician